Guido Ceronetti (24 August 1927 – 13 September 2018) was an Italian poet, philosopher, novelist, translator, journalist and playwright. He was born in Turin, Italy.

In 1970, he founded the Theater of the Sensitive. His works are archived at the Cantonal Library of Lugano. He wrote columns for La Repubblica, La Stampa and Radio Radicale.

Emil Cioran dedicated to his book Il silenzio del corpo ("The Silence of the Body") a chapter of the essay Exercices d'admiration (1986).

Ceronetti died in Cetona, Italy on 13 September 2018 from bronchopneumonia at the age of 91.

Works (in Italian)

Essaying, non-fiction and narrative 
 Difesa della luna e altri argomenti di miseria terrestre, Rusconi, Milano, 1971
 Aquilegia, illustrazioni di Erica Tedeschi, Rusconi, Milano, 1973; con il titolo Aquilegia. Favola sommersa, Einaudi, Torino, 1988
 La carta è stanca, Adelphi, Milano, 1976; II ed., Adelphi, 2000, 
 La musa ulcerosa: scritti vari e inediti, Rusconi, Milano, 1978
 Il silenzio del corpo. Materiali per studio di medicina, Adelphi, Milano, 1979 
 La vita apparente, Adelphi, Milano, 1982
 Un viaggio in Italia, 1981-1983,  Einaudi, Torino, 1983; nuova ed. con supplementi, Einaudi, 2004; con appendice di testi inediti e una nuova Prefazione dell'Autore, Einaudi, 2014, 
 Albergo Italia, Einaudi, Torino, 1985, 
 Briciole di colonna. 1975-1987, La Stampa, Torino, 1987, 
 Pensieri del tè, Adelphi, Milano, 1987, 
 L'occhiale malinconico, Adelphi, Milano, 1988,
 La pazienza dell'arrostito. Giornali e ricordi 1983-1987, Adelphi, Milano, 1990,
 D.D. Deliri Disarmati, Einaudi, Torino, 1993, 
 Tra pensieri, Adelphi, Milano, 1994,
 Cara incertezza, Adelphi, Milano, 1997, 
 Lo scrittore inesistente, La Stampa, Torino, 1999, 
 Briciole di colonna. Inutilità di scrivere, La Stampa, Torino, 1999, 
 La fragilità del pensare. Antologia filosofica personale a cura di Emanuela Muratori, BUR, Milano, 2000, 
 La vera storia di Rosa Vercesi e della sua amica Vittoria, Einaudi, Torino, 2000, 
 N.U.E.D.D. Nuovi Ultimi Esasperati Deliri Disarmati, Einaudi, Torino, 2001, 
 Piccolo inferno torinese, Einaudi, Torino, 2003, 
 Oltre Chiasso. Collaborazioni ai giornali della Svizzera italiana 1988-2001, Libreria dell'Orso, Pistoia, 2004, 
 La lanterna del filosofo, Adelphi, Milano, 2005, 
 Centoventuno pensieri del Filosofo Ignoto, La Finestra editrice, Lavis, 2006, 
 Insetti senza frontiere, Adelphi, Milano, 2009, 
 In un amore felice. Romanzo in lingua italiana, Adelphi, Milano, 2011,
 Ti saluto mio secolo crudele. Mistero e sopravvivenza del XX secolo, illustrazioni a cura di Guido Ceronetti e Laura Fatini, Einaudi, Torino, 2011, 
 L'occhio del barbagianni, Adelphi, Milano, 2014, 
 Tragico tascabile, Adelphi, Milano, 2015,
 Per le strade della Vergine, Adelphi, Milano, 2016,
 Per non dimenticare la memoria, Adelphi, Milano, 2016, 
 Regie immaginarie, Einaudi, Torino, 2018

Poetry 
 Nuovi salmi. Psalterium primum, Pacini Mariotti, Pisa, 1955, 1957
 La ballata dell'infermiere, Tallone, Alpignano, 1965
 Poesie, frammenti, poesie separate, Einaudi, Torino, 1968
 Poesie: 1968-1977, Corbo e Fiore, Venezia, 1978
 Poesie per vivere e per non vivere, Einaudi, Torino, 1979
 Storia d'amore del 1812 ritrovata nella memoria e altri versi, illustrazioni di Mimmo Paladino, Castiglioni & Corubolo, Verona, 1987
 Compassioni e disperazioni. Tutte le poesie 1946-1986, Einaudi, Torino, 1987, 
 Disegnare poesia (con Carlo Cattaneo), San Marco dei Giustiniani, Genova, 1991, 
 Scavi e segnali. Poesie inedite 1986-1992, Tallone, Alpignano, 1992
 La distanza. Poesie 1946-1996, Edizione riveduta e aggiornata dall'Autore, BUR, Milano, 1996, 
 (sotto lo pseudonimo Mehmet Gayuk), Il gineceo, Tallone, Alpignano, 1998; Adelphi, Milano, 1998
 Messia, Tallone, Alpignano, 2002; Adelphi, Milano, 2017, [nella prima parte del libro]
 Tre ballate recuperate dalle carte di Lugano: 1965, Tallone, Alpignano,  2003
 Le ballate dell'angelo ferito, Il Notes magico, Padova, 2009, 
 Poemi del Gineceo, Adelphi, Milano, 2012,   [riedizione de Il gineceo del 1998 con inediti e nuova prefazione]
 Sono fragile sparo poesia, Einaudi, Torino, 2012,

Theatre 
 Furori e poesia della Rivoluzione francese. 8-18 giugno 1989, Carte Segrete, Roma, 1984
 Mystic Luna Park. Spettacolo per marionette ideofore, ricordi figurativi di Giosetta Fioroni, Becco Giallo, Oderzo, 1988
 Teatro dei sensibili, La rivoluzione sconosciuta. Pensieri in libertà per ricordare 1789. Una scelta di testi a cura di Guido Ceronetti, Tallone, Alpignano, 1989 [raccolta di 44 locandine teatrali a fogli sciolti dalla mostra-spettacolo di Dogliani]
 Viaggia viaggia, Rimbaud!, Il melangolo, Genova, 1992
 La iena di San Giorgio. Tragedia per marionette, Einaudi, Torino, 1994, 
 Deliri disarmati. Nella messa in scena di Lorenzo Serveti per l'Associazione nazionale L'Albero, a cura di L. M. Musati e M. Lucidi, Grin, 1996, 
 Le marionette del Teatro dei Sensibili, Aragno, Torino, 2004,  [contiene: I Misteri di Londra e Mystic Luna Park]
 Rosa Vercesi, illustrazioni di Federico Maggioni, Edizioni Corraini, Mantova, 2005;

Translation to italian 
 Martial, Epigrammi, Collana I Millenni, Einaudi, Torino, 1964; Nuova edizione con un saggio di G. Ceronetti, Collana Gli struzzi n.187, Einaudi, 1979; La Finestra Editrice, Lavis, 2007
 I Salmi, Collana I Millenni, Einaudi, Torino, 1967; nuova ed. riveduta, Einaudi, Torino, 1994; col titolo Il Libro dei Salmi, Adelphi, Milano, 1985, 2006
 Catullus, Le poesie, Collana I Millenni, Torino, Einaudi, 1969
 Qohelet o l'Ecclesiaste, Einaudi, 1970, 1988, 1997, 2008; Qohelet. Colui che prende la parola, Milano, Adelphi, 2002
Decimus Iunius Iuvenalis, Le Satire, Collana I Millenni, Torino, Einaudi, 1971; La Finestra Editrice, Trento, 2008
Il Libro di Giobbe, Adelphi, Milano, 1972; nuova ed. riveduta, Adelphi, Milano, 1997
 Cantico dei cantici, Adelphi, Milano, 1975; Alberto Tallone Editore, Alpignano, 2011
 Il Libro del Profeta Isaia, Adelphi, Milano, 1981; nuova ed. riveduta e ampliata, Adelphi, Milano,  1992
 Come un talismano. Libro di traduzioni, Adelphi, Milano, 1986, 
 Costantino Kavafis, Tombe, Edizioni dell'Elefante, Roma, 1986
Iuvenalis, Le donne. Satira sesta, Alberto Tallone Editore, Alpignano, 1987
 Nostradamus: annunciatore nel secolo 16. della Rivoluzione che durerà dal 1789 al 1999 / profezie estratte dalle Centurie di Michel de Nostredame, Alpignano, Alberto Tallone Editore, 1989
 Tango delle capinere, Verona, Castiglioni & Corubolo, 1989
 Due versioni inedite da Shakespeare e da Céline, Pisa, Cursi, 1989
 Sofocles, Edipo Tyrannos. Coro 1186-1222, Roma, Edizioni dell'Elefante, 1990
 (con Cristina Chaumont) Sura 99. Al Zalzala (Il tremito della terra) dal Corano, calligrafia di Mauro Zennaro, Roma, Edizioni dell'Elefante, 1990
 Il Pater noster. Matteo 6, 9-13, calligrafia di Mauro Zennaro, Roma, Edizioni dell'Elefante, 1990
 Giorni di Kavafis. 1899-1928. Poesie di Constantinos Kavafis, Verona, Officina Chimerea, 1995
 Messia, Alpignano, Tallone, 2002; Milano, Adelphi, 2017 [nella seconda parte del libro]
 Siamo fragili, Spariamo poesia. i poeti delle letture pubbliche del Teatro dei Sensibili , Magnano, Qiqajon, 2003
 Constantinos Kavafis, Un'ombra fuggitiva di piacere, Milano, Adelphi, 2004
 Trafitture di tenerezza. Poesia tradotta 1963-2008, Torino, Einaudi, 2008, 
 Horatius, Odi. Scelte e tradotte da Guido Ceronetti, Milano, Adelphi, 2018

References

External links

1927 births
2018 deaths
Deaths from pneumonia in Tuscany
Deaths from bronchopneumonia
Italian male poets
Italian philosophers
Italian male novelists
Italian male journalists
Italian male dramatists and playwrights
20th-century Italian translators
Writers from Turin
20th-century Italian male writers